The 1968 Stanley Cup Finals was the championship series of the National Hockey League's (NHL) 1967–68 season, and the culmination of the 1968 Stanley Cup playoffs. It was contested between the Montreal Canadiens and the St. Louis Blues. The Canadiens swept the best-of-seven series in four games. It was the first Stanley Cup Finals after the NHL expansion to twelve teams. Although the series was a sweep, it was a much more intense and close-fought series than anyone had expected, as all four games were decided by one goal, two went to overtime, and the other two saw the winning goal scored in the third period.  The Blues were the only first-year franchise to play for the Stanley Cup in the post-expansion era, until the Vegas Golden Knights participated in the Stanley Cup Finals a half-century later.

Paths to the Finals

This was the first Stanley Cup championship after the 1967 NHL expansion. All of the new teams were placed in the West Division, all the Original Six teams were put in the East Division, and the playoffs were organized so that divisional champions would play off for the Stanley Cup.

Montreal defeated the Boston Bruins and Chicago Black Hawks to advance to the finals as the East Division champion.

St. Louis would defeat the Philadelphia Flyers and Minnesota North Stars to advance to the finals as the West Division champion.

Game summaries
The Montreal Canadiens finished first in the East Division with 94 points. The St. Louis Blues finished third in the West Division with 70 points. In this year's four-game regular season series, there were three wins for Montreal and one tie.

Coming into the series, most people were expecting the established Canadiens to blow the first-year Blues out of the water; after all, the Canadiens had dominated the East with 42 wins, while the Blues hadn't even finished with a winning record, with just 27 wins. However, what ended up happening would turn heads, as the Blues proceeded to put up a fight, riding the back of their goaltender, Glenn Hall.

Game three
Glenn Hall was sensational, especially in game three when the Canadiens outshot the Blues 46–15. Wrote Red Burnett, the dean of hockey writers then: "A number of Hall's saves were seemingly impossible. Experts walked out of the Forum convinced no other goaltender had performed so brilliantly in a losing cause." In the overtime of game three, Hall made a spectacular save on Dick Duff and then, standing on his head, made another save. "It was a heartbreaker to see," said Burnett. "After the saves on Duff, Bobby Rousseau came and batted home the second rebound." Hall's heroics even in defeat earned him the Conn Smythe Trophy as the most valuable player in the playoffs.

Game four
With their backs against the wall, the Blues put everything to the test, rallying from an early one-goal deficit to take the lead into the third period. However, Montreal was not to be denied and won the Stanley Cup in game four as J. C. Tremblay fired home the winning goal. When the game ended, the fans came on the ice to celebrate, and balloons, hats and programs were thrown from the stands. Jean Béliveau, in a cast and crutches from his broken ankle, with Ralph Backstrom accepted the Cup from NHL president Clarence Campbell and the players did a victory lap with the Cup.

Aftermath
Less than twelve minutes after the Canadiens won the Cup, Canadiens coach Toe Blake announced his retirement. He gave the reason that it had been a hard season, but the real reason was that his wife was dying of cancer and he wanted to spend his time with her. The celebration became a mournful event with players paying tribute to Blake, many in tears. He won eight Cups as the Canadiens' coach and three others as a player with the Canadiens and Montreal Maroons, the former being a record that stood for thirty-four years.

Stanley Cup engraving
The 1968 Stanley Cup was presented to Canadiens captain Jean Beliveau by NHL President Clarence Campbell following the Canadiens 3–2 win over the Blues in game four.

The following Canadiens players and staff had their names engraved on the Stanley Cup

1967–68 Montreal Canadiens

Notes

References
 
 

 
Stanley Cup
Montreal Canadiens games
St. Louis Blues games
Stanley Cup Finals
Ice hockey competitions in Montreal
Ice hockey competitions in St. Louis
Stanley Cup
1960s in St. Louis
1960s in Montreal
1968 in Quebec
Stanley Cup
May 1968 sports events in Canada